Yelkhovka is a rural locality (a village) in Rozhdestvenskoye Rural Settlement, Sobinsky District, Vladimir Oblast, Russia. The population was 26 as of 2010.

Geography 
Yelkhovka is located 34 km north of Sobinka (the district's administrative centre) by road. Burykino is the nearest rural locality.

References 

Rural localities in Sobinsky District